Yagya Dutt Sharma, alt. written Yagya Dutta Sharma, Yagyadutta Sharma, Yagyadutt sharma, Yagya Datta Sharma, Yagyadatta sharma, Yagya Datt Sharma, Yagyadatt Sharma, etc, may refer to;
Yagyadutt Sharma (novelist)
Yagya Datt Sharma (Madhya Pradesh politician)
Yagya Dutt Sharma (Punjab politician)
Yagya Datt Sharma (Uttar Pradesh politician)
Y. D. Sharma (professor)
Yagya Dutt Sharma (trade unionist)